Deh-e Pain (also Romanized as Deh-e Pā’īn and Deh Pā’īn) is a village in Bala Velayat Rural District, in the Central District of Torbat-e Heydarieh County, Razavi Khorasan Province, Iran. At the 2006 census, its population was 1,751, in 454 families.

References 

Populated places in Torbat-e Heydarieh County